Jill St. John (born Jill Arlyn Oppenheim; August 19, 1940) is a retired American actress. She may be best known for playing Tiffany Case, the first American Bond girl of the 007 franchise, in Diamonds Are Forever. Additional performances in film include Holiday for Lovers, The Lost World, Tender Is the Night, Come Blow Your Horn, for which she received a Golden Globe nomination, Who's Minding the Store?, Honeymoon Hotel, The Liquidator, The Oscar, Tony Rome, Sitting Target and The Concrete Jungle.

On television, St. John has appeared in such top rated shows as Batman, The Big Valley, Rowan & Martin's Laugh-In, Hart to Hart, Vega$, The Love Boat, Fantasy Island, Magnum, P.I. and Seinfeld. During her Hollywood heyday she was almost equally famous for her high-profile social life and frequent romantic associations with prominent public figures. St. John is married to actor Robert Wagner and has known him since she was 18 years old. They share credits on nearly a dozen screen and stage productions, notably the miniseries remake of Around the World in 80 Days.

Early life
St. John was born Jill Arlyn Oppenheim in Los Angeles on August 19, 1940, to Edward Oppenheim, a restaurateur from New York, and his philanthropist wife Betty (née Goldberg), from Philadelphia. She has no siblings. St. John grew up with many cousins, her mother being one of eight surviving children. St. John's parents married in 1934. Her maternal grandparents were Russian, while her paternal great-great-grandparents emigrated from Hessen, Germany.

Raised in Encino, St. John was a member of the Children's Ballet Company with Natalie Wood and Stefanie Powers. All three would later marry or co-star with actor Robert Wagner. When she was 13, her stage mother Betty changed Jill's last name to the more marketable St. John.

Career

Child actress
St. John began acting on radio at age six. In December 1949, at age nine, she made her screen debut in The Christmas Carol, the first full-length TV movie. Also that year, she joined the cast of Sandy Dreams, a TV show for children featuring Richard Beymer.

At age 11, she appeared in two episodes of The George Burns and Gracie Allen Show. She had a small role in the film Thunder in the East (1951) and was in episodes of Sky King, Fireside Theatre, and Cavalcade of America.

She attended Powers Professional School and received her high school diploma from Hollywood Professional School in the spring of 1955 at age 14. With a reported IQ of 162, at age 15 St. John enrolled at UCLA's Extension School.

During this time, she appeared on a large number of radio shows, notably One Man's Family.

Universal
St. John was 16 in May 1957 when Universal Pictures signed her to a contract for seven years starting at $200 a week. Her major studio film debut was in Summer Love (1958) starring John Saxon. She also appeared on TV in episodes of The Christophers, Schlitz Playhouse, and The DuPont Show of the Month (an adaptation of Junior Miss). She said her idol was Kay Kendall.

20th Century Fox

St John then signed a contract with 20th Century Fox who tried to build her into a star. She played the daughter of Clifton Webb in The Remarkable Mr. Pennypacker (1959) and Holiday for Lovers (1959), then was put in an adventure movie, The Lost World (1960).

"Nothing but starlet parts," she later said. "You know, the daughter, the niece, the girlfriend."

Fox picked up their option on her. Warner Bros. borrowed her for The Roman Spring of Mrs. Stone (1961), then she had a supporting role in Tender Is the Night (1962).

Comedy
St. John had a key role in Come Blow Your Horn (1963), where she starred opposite Frank Sinatra. She received a Golden Globe Award nomination as Best Actress – Motion Picture Musical or Comedy for her performance in the film.

"I'm a comedienne," she said in 1963. "I've never pretended to be a dramatic actress. But I'm very funny."

She followed this with a series of comedies: Who's Minding the Store? (1963) with Jerry Lewis, Who's Been Sleeping in My Bed? (1963) with Dean Martin, and Honeymoon Hotel (1964) with Robert Morse and Nancy Kwan.

"Now I play the sexy comedienne, which is my forte" she said in 1964. "Comedy is what I've always wanted to do."

She guest-starred on television shows like Voyage to the Bottom of the Sea, Burke's Law, The Rogues, and Theatre of Stars. In 1964, she guest-starred with Lauren Bacall and Bacall's then husband, Jason Robards, Jr., in the episode  "Take a Walk Through the Cemetery" of the drama series Mr. Broadway. She also appeared in some variety specials with Bob Hope.

MGM gave her the female lead in a spy spoof The Liquidator (1965) with Rod Taylor, and she was in The Oscar (1966) with Stephen Boyd.

St. John appeared in the first and second episodes of the television series Batman (1966) as the Riddler's moll Molly. She became the first person to die in an episode of Batman in that second episode. She was also in an episode of The Big Valley at that time.

Universal
St. John signed a contract at Universal. She was in a TV movie Fame Is the Name of the Game (1966), and had a supporting role in How I Spent My Summer Vacation (1967), with Robert Wagner.

She did the Bob Hope comedy Eight on the Run (1967), then made Banning (1967) with Wagner, and The King's Pirate (1967) with Doug McClure.

In 1966, she said her goal "was to be at a point where I have so proved myself as an actress that I can be more discriminating in the roles I choose. I want to be able to choose the parts I know I can do next." St. John nearly landed a starring role in The Fearless Vampire Killers (1967), which instead went to Sharon Tate.

She was reunited with Sinatra in Tony Rome (1967) and did a TV movie The Spy Killer (1968), which was popular enough for the sequel Foreign Exchange (1970). She guested on The Name of the Game. Decisions! Decisions! (1971) was a TV movie St. John did with Bob Newhart and Jean Simmons.

James Bond
St. John achieved her biggest success starring as diamond smuggler Tiffany Case, the love interest of James Bond in Diamonds Are Forever (1971), opposite Sean Connery. She was the first American to play a Bond girl. The character Tiffany is argumentative, abrasive, loud, and brash when compared to previous Bond girls, who were more demure.

In 1972, St. John appeared alongside Oliver Reed in the crime drama Sitting Target.

Television
St. John did the TV movies Saga of Sonora (1973) and Brenda Starr (1976) (playing the title role), and guest-starred on Vega$, The Love Boat, Magnum, P.I., Fantasy Island, and Matt Houston. She also appeared in the pilot episode for Hart to Hart.

St. John did the TV movies Two Guys from Muck (1982) and Rooster (1982) and was top-billed in the feature The Concrete Jungle (1982), a woman in prison film in which she played Warden Fletcher. She had a small role in The Act (1983).

During 1983–1984, she starred with Dennis Weaver on the short-lived soap opera Emerald Point N.A.S., in which she played Deanna Kinkaid, Thomas Mallory's conniving former sister-in-law.  It also starred another James Bond girl Maud Adams.

Later career
St. John and Robert Wagner were in Around the World in 80 Days (1989); Something to Believe In (1998); and The Calling (2002). They made brief cameo appearances as themselves in Robert Altman's Hollywood satire The Player (1992).

In 1996, they started appearing together on stage in a production of Love Letters.

In 1997, the couple appeared together at the end of "The Yada Yada" episode of the television sitcom Seinfeld.

St. John appeared without Wagner in Out There (1995) and The Trip (2002).

In 2014, St. John played Mrs. Claus in the TV movie Northpole alongside Wagner, who played the part of Santa Claus. The film marked her first acting role after a 12-year absence from the screen.

Other activities
In 1972, St. John largely left Hollywood behind and moved to Aspen, Colorado, where she focused on personal interests and cooking.

Her interest in cooking eventually led to her becoming a culinary personality, appearing in monthly cooking segments on ABC-TV's Good Morning America and her writing a column in USA Weekend magazine through the 1980s. This culminated in authoring The Jill St. John Cookbook (1987), a collection of healthy recipes and some anecdotes.

St. John also developed a handmade Angora sweater business, and became interested in orchid growing, skiing, hiking, river rafting, camping, and gardening. In 1987, she said "I'm a mountain gal now. I love the outdoors and I love harvesting and using fresh vegetables and herbs."

St. John is founder of the Aunts Club, a Rancho Mirage-based group of women who contribute at least $1,000 per year to provide financial support for a child.

Personal life
St. John has been married four times. Her husbands:

 Neil Dubin (May 12, 1957 – July 3, 1958; divorced) St. John was 16 years old when they eloped to Yuma, Arizona. Dubin was heir to a linen fortune. St. John complained that he harassed and ridiculed her.
 Lance Reventlow (March 24, 1960 – October 30, 1963; divorced) Reventlow was the son of Barbara Hutton, heir to the F. W. Woolworth fortune. St. John received a settlement of $86,000. Despite their divorce and subsequent remarriages, she refers to Reventlow as "my late husband" in interviews.
 Jack Jones (October 14, 1967 – February 28, 1969; divorced) Jones said demands on his singing career and the involved  traveling contributed to the breakup.
 Robert Wagner (May 26, 1990 – present) The couple first met in 1959 when they were contract players at 20th Century Fox, and have been together since Valentine's Day 1982.

Between marriages, St. John dated entertainment, sports, and political personalities including Ben Barnes, Gianni Bulgari, Sammy Cahn, Michael Caine, Oleg Cassini, Barry Coe, Sean Connery, Ahmet Ertegun, Robert Evans, Glenn Ford, David Frost, Jack Haley Jr., Bill Hudson, Henry Kissinger, Sidney Korshak, Sandy Koufax, Peter Lawford, George Lazenby, Jim Lonborg, Trini López, Tom Mankiewicz, George Montgomery, Jack Nicholson, Hugh O'Brian, Ogden Mills Phipps, Roman Polanski, Alejandro Rey, Tom Selleck, Frank Sinatra, U Thant, Robert Vaughn, Giovanni Volpi, Adam West and David L. Wolper. St. John has also had amorous relationships with criminal court judge Jerome M. Becker, ski instructor Ricky Head, Olympic ski champion Brownie Barnes, plastic surgeon Steven Zax, investment broker Lenny Ross, Chicago businessman Delbert W. Coleman and Brazilian entrepreneur Francisco "Baby" Pignatari. She was engaged to Miami real estate developer Robert Blum in 1974, but called off the engagement.

She has three stepdaughters:
 Katie Wagner, born 1964 to Wagner and Marion Marshall
 Natasha Gregson, born 1970 to Richard Gregson and Natalie Wood, but raised in the Wagner/St. John household after Wood died
 Courtney Wagner, born 1974 to Wagner and Wood

In July 2007, Wagner and St. John sold the Brentwood ranchette they had lived on since 1983, for a reported $14 million and relocated to their vacation home in Aspen. They retain a condo in L.A.

Mutual animosity between St. John and her husband's former sister-in-law, actress Lana Wood, extends back to 1971, when Sean Connery was simultaneously involved with both women during the filming of Diamonds Are Forever. The pair's half-century feud has been highlighted by two well-documented public altercations: one in September 1999, when St. John refused to be photographed with Wood at a Bond girl reunion for Vanity Fair magazine, and another in February 2016, when Wood crashed an event honoring St. John in Palm Springs and confronted Wagner over the reopened death case of her sister Natalie, who mysteriously drowned in 1981 while yachting with Wagner off the coast of Santa Catalina Island.

Filmography

Film

Television

Footnotes

References

External links

 
 
 
 Jill St. John at Yahoo! Movies
 Jill St. John at the British Film Institute

Living people
1940 births
Actresses from Los Angeles
American child actresses
American film actresses
American television actresses
American cookbook writers
American people of Russian-Jewish descent
Woolworth family
Women cookbook writers
20th-century American actresses
21st-century American actresses
American women non-fiction writers
Reventlow
Universal Pictures contract players
20th Century Studios contract players
People from Aspen, Colorado
United Service Organizations entertainers